The McAbee Fossil Beds is a Heritage Site that protects an Eocene Epoch fossil locality east of Cache Creek, British Columbia, Canada, just north of and visible from Provincial Highway 97 / the Trans-Canada Highway (Highway 1).  The McAbee Fossil Beds, comprising , were officially designated a Provincial Heritage Site under British Columbia's Heritage Conservation Act on July 19, 2012. The site is part of an old lake bed which was deposited about 52 million years ago and is internationally recognised for the diversity of plant, insect, and fish fossils found there. Similar fossil beds in Eocene lake sediments, also known for their well preserved plant, insect and fish fossils, are found at Driftwood Canyon Provincial Park near Smithers in northern British Columbia, on the Horsefly River near Quesnel in central British Columbia, and at Republic in Washington, United States. The Princeton Chert fossil beds in southern British Columbia are also Eocene, but primarily preserve an aquatic plant community. A 2016 review of the early Eocene fossil sites from the interior of British Columbia discusses the history of paleobotanical research at McAbee, the Princeton Chert, Driftwood Canyon, and related Eocene fossil sites such as at Republic.

The McAbee Fossil Beds reopened for public viewing on June 21, 2019. The McAbee site is now under the management of the Bonaparte First Nation, who have title on the lands.CBC News

Palaeontology and geology

Fossil plants from the same area as the McAbee fossil beds (Cache Creek and Kamloops B.C.) were first reported by G.M. Dawson. Palaeontological and geological studies of the McAbee Fossil Beds first commenced in the 1960s and early 1970s by Len Hills of the University of Calgary and his students on the fossil palynology (spores and pollen) and leaf fossils, and research on the fossil fish from the fossil beds by Mark Wilson of the University of Alberta. Thomas Ewing provided a detailed analysis of the geology of the Kamloops Group, including the McAbee beds. More recently, Lowe et al. have assessed in detail the site lithostratigraphy. Significant research on the fossil plants and insects has only occurred since the late 1980s. The McAbee Fossil Beds are best known for the abundant and well-preserved insect and fish fossils (Amyzon, Eohiodon, and Eosalmo). Eohiodon rosei from the McAbee Fossil Beds and other Eocene sites in British Columbia is now considered to belong to the present-day mooneye genus Hiodon.

The extraordinary detail preserved in the insect fossils, as well as the high diversity of insects, plants and other organisms means the McAbee Fossil Beds represent a Konservat-Lagerstätten.

Flora 

Fossils of plant leaves, shoots, seeds, flowers and cones are abundant and well preserved, and include up to 76 genera of plants. Fossil plants described from the fossil beds include rare fruits such as Dipteronia brownii, a genus of trees now endemic to China, extinct members of the birch family (Betulaceae) such as Palaeocarpinus, maples (Acer rousei), fruits and leaves of the beech Fagus langevinii and the elm Ulmus okanaganensis.

Below is an incomplete list of the plant genera found in the McAbee fossil beds based on the list found in Dillhoff, Leopold & Manchester (2005) and Wilson (2009) with extinct taxa denoted with a †.

Insects and other arthropods
The fossil insects are particularly diverse and well preserved, and include an extinct bulldog ant Macabeemyrma ovata, a species of green lacewing (Neuroptera, Chrysopidae) (Archaeochrysa profracta), and stick insects (Phasmatodea). A species of fossil freshwater crayfish (Aenigmastacus crandalli) was described from the McAbee Fossil Beds. The very high diversity of fossil insects in the McAbee fossil beds is comparable to that of modern-day tropical forest areas. Additionally, fossil palm beetles (Bruchinae) were detailed from the beds, confirming the presence of palms (Arecaceae) in the local environment in the early Eocene.

Below is an incomplete list of the insect Orders, superfamilies and families, and genera found in the McAbee Fossil Beds based on information in Archibald, Bossert, Greenwood, and Farrell (2010), Archibald, Mathewes, and Greenwood (2013), Archibald, Rasnitsyn and Akhmetiev (2005) and other sources cited in the list below, with extinct taxa denoted with a †.

Collections and collecting status
Collections of fossils are housed in the Royal BC Museum in Victoria, B.C.; the Royal Tyrrell Museum of Palaeontology in Drumheller Alberta; the Royal Ontario Museum; the Canadian Museum of Nature in Ottawa; the Burke Museum of Natural History and Culture in Seattle, WA; as well as in university collections, principally Thompson Rivers University in Kamloops, B.C.; and Brandon University in Manitoba. Significant collections of fossils from the McAbee Fossil Beds were in private ownership and fossils from the McAbee Fossil Beds are listed for sale on the internet. In August 2018 a substantial private collection of fossils from McAbee was donated to the Royal British Columbia Museum.

The cessation of fossil collecting at the McAbee Fossil Beds through heritage listing is consistent with British Columbia's Fossil Management Framework which seeks to:

 clarify the rules governing the management and use of fossils;
 manage impacts on fossils from other activities;
 provide for the stewardship of significant fossil sites;
 raise internal and external awareness of the framework and the importance of fossils;
 build knowledge of the nature and extent of the resource in British Columbia; and
 clarify the rights and obligations of the public, business, government and other stakeholders.

References 

Cenozoic paleontological sites of North America
Natural history of British Columbia
Fossil parks in Canada
Eocene plants
Lagerstätten
Paleontology in Canada
Thompson Country
Thompson-Nicola Regional District
2012 in paleontology
Heritage sites in British Columbia
Eocene paleontological sites
Paleontology in British Columbia